Eszter Pap (born 3 June 1993 in Budapest) is a Hungarian professional triathlete and European Championships bronze medalist of the year 2011.
Since 2008 she has been a member of the Heraklesz high performance team.

Sports career 
In the Hungarian elite ranking called Ranglista Eszter Pap is number 10.

In 2011, Eszter Pap also takes part in the German elite circuit 2. Bundesliga (Nord) and represents EJOT Team TV Buschhütten.
At the opening triathlon in Gladbeck (15 May 2011), Pap had the second best time and her team (Charlotte Morel, Mignon Vatlach, Scarlet Vatlach) placed first.
At the second Bundesliga triathlon in Gütersloh (22 May 2011), Pap placed first in the individual ranking, and again her team won the gold medal.

At the 2011 European Junior Championships in Pontevedra, Pap won the bronze medal and together with Eszter Dudás, David Pap and Gabor Hanko she placed fourth in the Mix Relay.

In Hungary, from 2008 to 2010 Eszter Pap represented the club ORTRI, since 2011 she is part of the elite team of Triatlon Villám (Budapest) and attends the highschool Csik Ferenc Általános Iskola és Gimnázium.

Eszter's younger brother David and her elder sister Csilla also take part in ITU competitions.

ITU Competitions 
In the two years from 2009 to 2010, Eszter Pap took part in 9 ITU events and achieved 5 top ten positions, among which one gold and two silver medals.
In 2011, she started the season with the European Cup gold medal in Vienna.
The following list is based upon the official ITU rankings and the ITU Athletes's Profile Page.
Unless indicated otherwise, the following events are triathlons (Olympic Distance) and refer to the Elite category.

External links 
 Eszter Pap's club Triatlon Villám in Hungarian
 Hungarian triathlon Federation in Hungarian

Gallery

Notes 

1993 births
Living people
Sportspeople from Budapest
Hungarian female triathletes